Shawn Mendes (alternatively Shawn Mendes: The Album) is the third studio album by Canadian singer Shawn Mendes, released through Island Records on May 25, 2018. It is primarily a pop record, with ingrained influences of pop rock, blues, and R&B. Mendes worked with Ryan Tedder, Julia Michaels, John Mayer, Ed Sheeran, Johnny McDaid, Camila Cabello, and Khalid. Among the producers are Tedder, Teddy Geiger, Louis Bell, Ian Kirkpatrick, with Mendes serving as an executive producer.

The album debuted at number one in Canada, making it Mendes' third number one album in his home country. It also debuted at the top of the US Billboard 200. It marked Mendes' third number one album in the US, making him the third youngest artist to top the chart at least three times. The album also topped the charts in Australia, Austria, Belgium, the Netherlands, Spain and Switzerland. It received generally positive reviews from music critics.

The lead single, "In My Blood" peaked at number 11 on the US Billboard Hot 100, and reached the top ten in several other countries. "In My Blood", "Lost in Japan", and "Youth" were certified gold or higher in Canada. The album was nominated for Best Pop Vocal Album and "In My Blood" for Song of the Year at the 61st Annual Grammy Awards.

On July 26, 2019, a deluxe version of the album including Mendes' "If I Can't Have You" and the Billboard Hot 100 number-one collaboration with singer Camila Cabello, "Señorita", were released on digital platforms and physical format in certain countries.

Background
The album was recorded over three to four months, primarily at The Woodshed Studio in Malibu, California. Recording sessions also took place in Port Antonio, Jamaica. Mendes drew inspiration from music artists Justin Timberlake, Kings of Leon, Kanye West and Daniel Caesar while making the record. In an interview with The Recording Academy, he declared:

Promotion
To announce the release date, album artwork, and title, Mendes hosted a 9-hour live video stream on YouTube, culminating on April 26, 2018, at midnight. The livestream featured a crew setting up a floral arrangement to recreate the album's cover.

In promotion of the album, Mendes played a concert at the Ford Theatres in Hollywood on May 17, which was live-streamed by Apple Music and followed by a Q&A with radio presenter Zane Lowe. In a surprise PR stunt, Mendes and his team made a stop at Simon Baruch Middle School in NYC, performing three acoustic songs off the new album. The recording of the performance, titled Shawn Mendes: Live In Los Angeles, was released by Apple Music.

Mendes also spent the week of June 4, 2018, on The Late Late Show with James Corden where he performed one of his new songs each night. The full week event was hashtagged as LateLateShawn on social media. He also did a Carpool Karaoke episode where he sang some of his new songs alongside his old ones.

Spotify invited Mendes’ fans for an intimate Spotify Fans First event held on July 19 at Beverly Hills, California.

To promote the album, Mendes embarked on his third solo world tour, called Shawn Mendes: The Tour.

Singles
"In My Blood" was released on March 22, 2018, as the album's lead single, and sent to contemporary hit radio on March 27. "Lost in Japan" was released as the second single on March 23, 2018. "Youth", which features American singer Khalid, was released as the third single. "Where Were You in the Morning?" was released as the fourth single on May 18. "Nervous" was released as the fifth single on May 23. "If I Can't Have You" and "Señorita" were originally released as standalone singles on May 3, 2019, and June 21, 2019, respectively. They were later added to the deluxe edition of the album.

Critical reception

Shawn Mendes received generally positive reviews from music critics, with particular praise towards Mendes' songwriting and artistic maturity compared to his previous work.

Ilana Kaplan from The Independent gave the album 4 of 5 stars, praising Mendes's maturity compared to his previous album: "With his latest effort, the 19-year-old singer moves beyond stereotypical relationship woes and goes for something more personal." In another positive review, Jem Aswad from Variety opined the album as a "remarkably well-crafted pop album that finds the singer trying on different styles, prominently showcasing his collaborators and making some flagrant references - yet his persona has become strong enough that he's never overpowered by any of it." Hannah Mylrea of NME complimented Mendes's growth, calling his rock- and funk-inspired sound "a bright and bold new direction." Mike Nied of Idolator called it his best album to date, in addition to one of the best of the year so far.

Jon Caramanica of The New York Times gave a mixed review, calling the album "appealing if not wholly engaging, full of pleasantly anonymous songs that systematically obscure Mr. Mendes's talents." Jamieson Cox of Pitchfork gave a rating of 5.1 out of 10, noting that Mendes's songs lack a unique sound, "and you can imagine them being recorded by anyone: Nick Jonas, Charlie Puth, a random choice from the One Direction diaspora." In a three-star review, The Guardian Laura Snapes opined that Mendes's "attempt to detoxify pop masculinity is admirable, but you’re left yearning for a bit of rough and tumble."

Mark Kennedy of the Associated Press gave the album a positive review, praising the songwriting, hooks, as well as the duet with Khalid, but was unimpressed by "Like to Be You", the duet with singer Julia Michaels and "Fallin' All in You", co-written with Ed Sheeran and Johnny McDaid.  Maeve McDermott of USA Today highlighted "In My Blood" as one of the best songs, saying the album "nails the innocence, thrills and pain that’s unique to being 19, alone and hopeful." In contrast, Brittany Spanos of Rolling Stone called "In My Blood" one of the album's weakest songs, favouring instead the collaborations with Michaels.  Chris Gillet from South China Morning Post complimented Mendes' songwriting abilities as well, citing "Because I Had You", "Perfectly Wrong", and "When You're Ready" as the album's highlights, as well as acclaiming his vocal performance in "Perfectly Wrong," but was critical with "Queen" and "Fallin' All in You" labelling them "generic," he ended the review with awarding the album 4 out of 5 stars.

Accolades

Awards and nominations

Year-end lists

Commercial performance
Shawn Mendes debuted at number one on the Billboard Canadian Albums Chart with 32,000 album-equivalent units, becoming Mendes' third Canadian number-one album. On October 3, 2018, Shawn Mendes was certified Platinum by Music Canada for shipments of 80,000 copies in the country.

Shawn Mendes debuted atop the ARIA Albums Chart, giving Mendes his first number-one album in Australia. On the UK Albums Chart, the album opened at number three, with first-week sales of 23,419.

Shawn Mendes debuted at number one on the US Billboard 200 with 182,000 album-equivalent units (including 142,000 pure album sales), becoming Mendes' third consecutive US number-one album. This feat made Mendes the third youngest artist to top the chart with at least 3 albums, along with Miley Cyrus and Justin Bieber. At the time, it became Mendes' best performing week ever, the fifth-best week of the year, and the second-biggest week for a pop album of the year, behind only Justin Timberlake's Man of the Woods. Additionally, it became the second most streamed pop album in 2018 for the first week, behind Timberlake, and the most streamed on the first week on Apple Music, surpassing Timberlake's record.

Track listing
Credits adapted from iTunes Store metadata.

Notes
 signifies an additional producer
 signifies a co-producer

Charts

Weekly charts

Year-end charts

Decade-end charts

Certifications

Release history

References

2018 albums
Island Records albums
Shawn Mendes albums
Albums produced by Andrew Watt (record producer)
Albums produced by Joel Little
Albums produced by Louis Bell
Albums produced by Ryan Tedder
Juno Award for Pop Album of the Year albums
Juno Award for Album of the Year albums